Shujaat Husain Khan (born 19 May 1960) is one of the greatest North Indian musicians and sitar players of his generation. He belongs to the Imdadkhani gharana school of music. He has recorded over 100 albums and was nominated for a Grammy Award for Best World Music Album for his work with the band Ghazal with Iranian musician Kayhan Kalhor. He also sings frequently. His style of sitar playing, known as gayaki ang, is imitative of the subtleties of the human voice.

Early life
Born in Calcutta, Shujaat Khan is the son of legendary sitar player Ustad Vilayat Khan and Monisha Hazra. Shujaat Khan's musical career began at the age of three when he began practicing on a specially made small sitar. By the age of six, he was recognized as a child prodigy and began formal performances. He had privilege of being influenced by great artists like Ustaad Amir Khan (singer), Pandit Bhimsen Joshi, Vidushi Kishori Amonkar and many more. He has musical pedigree that extends back to seven generations: his grandfather, Ustad Enayat Khan; his great-grandfather, Ustad Imdad Khan; and his great-great-grandfather, Ustad Sahebdad Khan - all leading artists and torchbearers of the Imdadkhani gharana with its roots from Naugaon from Uttar Pradesh, India. His forefathers lived in Saharanpur, Agra, Itawa, Varanasi, Indore, Kolkata, Gouripur (now in Bangladesh), Delhi, Lucknow, Mumbai, Shimla and Dehradun. He has a brother, sitarist Hidayat Khan and two sisters Sufi singer, Zila Khan and Yaman Khan. Shujaat Kahn is married to Parveen Khan and their son Azaan is a music composer.

Performing career
Shujaat Husain Khan gave his first concert at the age of 6 at Jehangir Art Gallery, Mumbai. Shujaat Hussain Khan has performed at numerous music festivals in India and has traveled around the world performing in Asia, Africa, North America and Europe. This includes Sawai Gandharva Sangeet Mahotsav, Pandit Jitendra Abhisheki Sangeet Samaroha, Maitra Mahotsav, etc.

His approach to rhythm is largely intuitive, fresh and spontaneous, always astonishing his audiences. He is also known for his exceptional voice, which he uses for singing folk songs, including the album Lajo Lajo, as well as poetry, as in Hazaron Khwaishen.

Shujaat Khan was featured in the concerts celebrating India's 60th anniversary of independence in 2007, and performed at the Carnegie Hall, New York City with the Iranian musician Kayhan Kalhor Paramount Theater, Seattle, and Meyers Symphony Theater, Dallas. In a special performance, he also played at the United Nations in the Assembly Hall, Geneva.

His memorable appearances include performance at the Royal Albert Hall in London, Royce Hall in Los Angeles and Congress Hall in Berlin. In the summer of 1999, he was the featured soloist with the Edmonton Symphony Orchestra in Canada. His collaboration with different genres of music has been a very strong point as is evidenced by the enormously successful Indo-Persian venture, Ghazal. Their album, The Rain, was nominated for a Grammy award in 2004.

In January 2000, the Boston Herald listed Shujaat Khan, along with luminaries like Seiji Ozawa and Luciano Pavarotti among the top 25 upcoming cultural events for the year.

He has been invited as visiting faculty at the Dartington School of Music in England, the University of Washington in Seattle, and at UCLA.

He is also known as a fearless collaborator, lately having done wide-ranging concerts with artists as diverse as Karsh Kale to a successful Jugalbandi with pioneer Hindustani vocalist Ustad Rashid Khan. One of the best remembered collaborations of the year 2009-2010 happens to be Melange. Featuring Tim Ries on the saxophone, Kevin Hays on the piano, Karsh Kale on percussion, Katayoun Goudarzi on vocals, Ustaad Shujaat Khan on sitar, Karl Peters on bass and Yogesh Samsi on tabla, Melange (band) has toured extensively across India.

Ustad Shujaat Khan has recently tied up with Inroom Records, a Mumbai-based experimental / fusion label and artist management company, to handle his collaborative work.

He collaborated in 2014 Persian traditional music album Beyond Any Form.

Discography
Shujaat Khan has over 100 musical releases on a variety of international labels; and a video called Khandan.
 Waiting for Love (Shujaat Khan album) 1999
 Ruby (2015) Shujaat Husain Khan (Sitar), Katayoun Goudarzi (Vocal), Ajay Prasanna (Flute), Abhiman Kaushal (Tabla), Ahsan Ali (Sarangi), Prabhat Mukherjee (Santoor), Amjad Khan (Percussion)
 Spring (2013) Shujaat Husain Khan (Sitar & vocal), Katayoun Goudarzi (Vocal), Ajay Prasanna (Flute), Abhiman Kaushal (Tabla)
 Dawning (2013) Katayoun Goudarzi (vocal), Kevin Hays (piano), Shujaat Husain Khan (sitar, vocal), Abhiman Kaushal (tabla) & Tim Ries (tenor & soprano saxophones, bass clarinet, Hungarian folk flute)

See also
 Sitar
 Imdadkhani gharana
 Ustad Vilayat Khan

References

External links

 Official site

1960 births
Etawah gharana
Hindustani instrumentalists
Living people
Sitar players
Indian male classical musicians
Indian music educators
Indian classical composers
Musicians from Kolkata